The Woodhull Institute is a training organization in the United States, co-founded by Naomi Wolf and Robin Stern, for the purpose of ethical leadership training and professional development for women.

References 

Women's organizations based in the United States